José María Amorrortu Prieto (born 22 July 1953) is a Spanish former football forward and manager.

Playing career
Born in Bilbao, Biscay, Amorrortu signed with Athletic Bilbao in the summer of 1973 from neighbouring amateurs CD Getxo. He went on to spend five seasons in La Liga with the former club, making his debut on 2 September 1973 in a 2–1 away loss against RC Celta de Vigo. He added 11 appearances in the runner-up run in the 1976–77 edition of the UEFA Cup, featuring in the 2–1 home win over Juventus F.C. in the second leg of the final.

After only 13 games in the 1977–78 campaign, Amorrortu signed with Real Zaragoza also in the top division. He scored a career-best (at the professional level) ten goals in his first year, but his team could only finish in 14th position; until his retirement in 1983, aged only 30, he competed solely in that tier.

Coaching career
Amorrortu began working as a coach immediately after retiring, spending his first decade in the Segunda División B or lower and also working at youth level, notably with Athletic Bilbao, where he was credited for bringing Fernando Llorente to the club. His first season at the professional level was 1994–95, when he was in charge of Bilbao Athletic in the Segunda División. Additionally, he had short spells as caretaker manager for their senior team in 1995 and 1996.

After leaving Athletic, Amorrortu became manager of SD Eibar also from the Basque Country (second tier), signing a two-year contract with Real Sociedad on 3 June 2004 and being fired in late January 2006. From 2006 until 2011 he acted as director of Atlético Madrid's academy before returning to the same role at Athletic Bilbao, departing at the end of 2018 when Aitor Elizegi was elected president and implemented personnel changes.

Amorrortu also spent time as coach of the unofficial Basque Country regional side, for which he also featured and scored as a player.

Honours

Player
Athletic Bilbao
Copa del Rey runner-up: 1976–77
UEFA Cup runner-up: 1976–77

Manager
Barakaldo
Tercera División: 1987–88

References

External links

Athletic Bilbao manager profile

1953 births
Living people
Spanish footballers
Footballers from Bilbao
Association football forwards
La Liga players
Tercera División players
SD Indautxu footballers
CD Getxo players
Athletic Bilbao footballers
Real Zaragoza players
Spain under-21 international footballers
Spanish football managers
La Liga managers
Segunda División managers
Segunda División B managers
Tercera División managers
SD Amorebieta managers
Barakaldo CF managers
Athletic Bilbao B managers
Athletic Bilbao managers
SD Eibar managers
Real Sociedad managers
Athletic Bilbao non-playing staff
Spanish sports executives and administrators